Auguste Marchais (4 October 1872 in Paris – 16 November 1952 in Courbevoie) was a French track and field athlete who competed at the 1900 Summer Olympics in Paris, France. Marchais competed in the marathon. He was one of six runners to not finish the marathon.

References

External links 

 
 French Olympians F-P 

Athletes (track and field) at the 1900 Summer Olympics
Olympic athletes of France
French male long-distance runners
French male marathon runners
Athletes from Paris
1872 births
1952 deaths